Lingdangge Subdistrict is a subdistrict located at the south end of Hongqiao District, Tianjin, China. It borders Jieyuan Subdistrict in the north, Gulou Subdistrict in the east, Guangkai Subdistrict in the south, and Changhong Subdistrict in the south and west. As of 2010, it had a population of 39157.

The subdistrict was founded in 1998. the name Lingdangge comes from a Buddhist Temple that used to exist within the region until 1892. The name is often pronounced as "Lingdanggao" among the locals.

Administrative divisions 
In the year 2021, Lingdangge Subdistrict consisted of 12 residential communities. They are, by the order of their Administrative division codes:

See also 

 List of township-level divisions of Tianjin

References 

Township-level divisions of Tianjin
Hongqiao District, Tianjin